National revival or national awakening is a period of ethnic self-consciousness that often precedes a political movement for national liberation but that can take place at a time when independence is politically unrealistic. In the history of Europe, national revivals are most commonly associated with the period of romantic nationalism that started in the 18th and 19th centuries.

The classic definition is by Miroslav Hroch, who wrote that national revivals take place within a "nondominant ethnic group" characterized by lack of "'its own' nobility or ruling classes," possessing no state and with a "literary tradition in its own language" that is "incomplete or interrupted."    A national revival begins when a group of educated members of such an "ethnic community" conclude that their group is a "nation" that needs to be "awakened, revived, and made aware," and to achieve recognition from other nations.   This educated group then initiates a "national movement" which entails, "purposeful activity aimed at achieving all the attributes of a fully formed nation."

In The Dynamics of Cultural Nationalism: The Gaelic Revival and the Creation of the Irish Nation State, (2003), John Hutchinson argues that a national revival can serve as a focus for nationalist activity in lieu of opportunities for political or military movement toward autonomy.

Examples

Pre modern
 Kokugaku (Japan)
 Shu'ubiyya (Persia)

19th century
 Rise of nationalism in the Ottoman Empire

20th century
 Indonesian National Awakening

See also
 National awakening (disambiguation)

References